Aurélio Granada Escudeiro (19 May 1920 – 25 August 2012) was a Portuguese prelate of the Roman Catholic Church.

Escudeiro was born in Alcains, Portugal and was ordained a priest on 17 January 1943.

He was appointed Coadjutor Bishop of the Diocese of Angra on 18 March 1974 as well as titular bishop of Drusiliana, and was ordained bishop on 26 May 1974. Escudeiro was appointed Bishop of the Diocese of Angra on 30 June 1979, where he would serve until his retirement on 9 April 1996.

He died on 25 August 2012 at the Casa Sacerdotal in Ponta Delgada.

External links
Catholic-Hierarchy
Diocese of Angra Website
Diocese of Angra Profile
D. Aurélio Granada Escudeiro has died

20th-century Roman Catholic bishops in Portugal
1920 births
2012 deaths